Thallium(I) nitrate, also known as thallous nitrate, is a thallium compound with the formula TlNO3. It is a colorless and highly toxic salt.

Preparation 
Thallium(I) nitrate can be produced by reacting thallium(I) iodide with nitric acid.

However, the production is simpler starting from the metal, its hydroxide or the carbonate:

Toxicity 
Thallium(I) nitrate is extremely toxic, like many other thallium compounds. It is highly toxic by ingestion but can also be absorbed through skin due to its solubility in water.

See also 
 Thallium(III) nitrate

References 

Thallium(I) compounds
Nitrates